Vulkov dol is a village in Gabrovo Municipality, in Gabrovo Province, in northern central Bulgaria.   It has a population of 2 people.

References

Villages in Gabrovo Province